Conus artoptus, common name the tender cone, is a species of sea snail, a marine gastropod mollusk in the family Conidae, the cone snails and their allies.

Like all species within the genus Conus, these snails are predatory and venomous. They are capable of "stinging" humans, therefore live ones should be handled carefully.

Description
The size of the shell varies between 35 mm and 79 mm. The shell is narrow, cylindrical, and encircled by minutely granose striae. Its color is whitish, broadly three-banded by oblong longitudinal clouds of orange-brown, the interstices brown-spotted.

Distribution
This marine species occurs off the Philippines, Indo-Malaysia, the Solomon Islands, in the Sulu Sea, off Vanuatu and Australia (Northern Territory, Queensland, Western Australia)

References

 Sowerby, G.B. (1st) 1833. Conus. pls 24-37 in Sowerby, G.B. (2nd) (ed). The Conchological Illustrations or coloured figures of all the hitherto unfigured recent shells. London : G.B. Sowerby (2nd).
 Reeve, L.A. 1843. Monograph of the genus Conus. pls 1-39 in Reeve, L.A. (ed.). Conchologica Iconica. London : L. Reeve & Co. Vol. 1.
 Adams, A. 1854. Descriptions of new species of the Genus Conus, from the collection of Hugh Cuming, Esq. Proceedings of the Zoological Society of London 1853(21): 116-119
 Cernohorsky, W.O. 1978. Tropical Pacific marine shells. Sydney : Pacific Publications 352 pp., 68 pls.
 Wilson, B. 1994. Australian Marine Shells. Prosobranch Gastropods. Kallaroo, WA : Odyssey Publishing Vol. 2 370 pp.
 Röckel, D., Korn, W. & Kohn, A.J. 1995. Manual of the Living Conidae. Volume 1: Indo-Pacific Region. Wiesbaden : Hemmen 517 pp.
  Petit, R. E. (2009). George Brettingham Sowerby, I, II & III: their conchological publications and molluscan taxa. Zootaxa. 2189: 1–218
 Puillandre N., Duda T.F., Meyer C., Olivera B.M. & Bouchet P. (2015). One, four or 100 genera? A new classification of the cone snails. Journal of Molluscan Studies. 81: 1-23

External links
 The Conus Biodiversity website
 Cone Shells - Knights of the Sea
 

artoptus
Gastropods described in 1833